Marcel Golay may refer to:

 Marcel Golay (astronomer) (1927–2015), Swiss astronomer from Geneva
 Marcel J. E. Golay (1902–1989),  Swiss mathematician and physicist from Neuchâtel